Vietnascincus is a genus of skinks. It contains one species, Vietnascincus rugosus, which is endemic to Vietnam.

References

Skinks
Monotypic lizard genera
Reptiles of Vietnam
Endemic fauna of Vietnam
Taxa named by Ilya Darevsky
Taxa named by Nikolai Loutseranovitch Orlov